This is an incomplete list of Statutory Instruments of the United Kingdom in 1953. This listing is the complete, 19 items, "Partial Dataset" as listed on www.legislation.gov.uk (as at March 2014).

Statutory Instruments
The Diseases of Animals (Extension of Definition of Poultry) Order 1953 SI 1953/37
The Psittacosis or Ornithosis Order 1953 SI 1953/38
The Merchant Shipping (Confirmation of Legislation) (Federation of Malaya) Order 1953 SI 1953/195
The Veterinary Surgeons (University Degrees) (Cambridge) Order of Council 1953 SI 1953/404
The Airways Corporations (General Staff Pensions) (Amendment) Regulations, 1953 SI 1953/611
The Trading with the Enemy (Enemy Territory Cessation) (France) Order 1953 SI 1953/780
The Coal Industry (Superannuation Scheme) (Winding Up, No. 5) Regulations 1953 SI 1953/845
The National Insurance and Industrial Injuries (Reciprocal Agreement with Italy) Order 1953 SI 1953/884
The Merchant Shipping (Confirmation of Legislation) (Cyprus) Order 1953 SI 1953/972
The Stores for Explosives Order, 1953 SI 1953/1197
The Merchant Shipping Safety Convention (Singapore) No.1 Order, 1953 SI 1953/1218
The Merchant Shipping Safety Convention (Singapore) No. 2 Order 1953 SI 1953/1219
British Transport Commission (Executives) Order 1953 SI 1953/1291
The Airways Corporations (Radio, Navigating and Engineer Officers Pensions) Regulations, 1953 SI 1953/1296
The British Transport Commission (Pensions of Employees) Regulations 1953 SI 1953/1445
The Consular Conventions (Kingdom of Greece) Order 1953 SI 1953/1454
The Consular Conventions (French Republic) Order 1953 SI 1953/1455
The Iron and Steel Foundries Regulations, 1953 SI 1953/1464
The Iron and Steel (Compensation to Officers and Servants) (No. 2) Regulations 1953 SI 1953/1849

Unreferenced Listings
The following 10 items were previously listed on this article, however are unreferenced on the authorities site, included here for a "no loss" approach.
 The House of Commons (Redistribution of Seats) (Scotland) (Bothwell, North Lanarkshire and Motherwell) Order 1953 SI 1953/386
The House of Commons (Redistribution of Seats) (Scotland) (Bothwell, North Lanarkshire and Coatbridge and Airdrie) Order 1953 SI 1953/387 
The House of Commons (Redistribution of Seats) (Scotland) (West Renfrewshire and Greenock) Order 1953 SI 1953/388 
The House of Commons (Redistribution of Seats) (Scotland) (Clackmannan and East Stirlingshire and Stirling and Falkirk Burghs) Order 1953 SI 1953/389 
The House of Commons (Redistribution of Seats) (Scotland) (West Fife and Kirkcaldy Burghs) Order 1953 SI 1953/390 
Transfer of Functions (Ministry of Pensions) Order 1953 SI 1953/1198
Doncaster Corporation Trolley Vehicles (Increase of Charges) Order 1953 SI 1953/1348
Mule Spinning (Health) Special Regulations 1953 SI 1953/1545
Civil Defence (Grant) Regulations 1953 SI 1953/1777
Civil Defence (Grant) (Scotland) Regulations 1953 SI 1953/1804

References

External links
Legislation.gov.uk delivered by the UK National Archive
UK SI's on legislation.gov.uk
UK Draft SI's on legislation.gov.uk

See also
 List of Statutory Instruments of the United Kingdom

Lists of Statutory Instruments of the United Kingdom
Statutory Instruments